Julio José Frenk Mora (born December 20, 1953) is president of the University of Miami and has served in this role since 2015. He is the University of Miami's first Hispanic and native Spanish-speaking president. At the University of Miami, he is also a professor of public health science at the university's Leonard M. Miller School of Medicine, professor of health sector management at the university's Herbert Business School, and professor of sociology at its College of Arts of Sciences.

Prior to being appointed University of Miami president, Frenk was dean of the Harvard T.H. Chan School of Public Health at Harvard University from 2009 to 2015 and a  professor of public health and international development at Harvard Kennedy School. Prior to his appointments at Harvard University, Frenk was the Mexican government's Secretary of Health from 2002 until 2006.

Early life and education
Frenk was born in Mexico City on December 20, 1953. His father and grandfather, both of whom were phyisicians, were Jews who fled to Mexico from Nazi Germany.

Frenk received his medical degree from the National Autonomous University of Mexico in Mexico City in 1979. He then attend the University of Michigan, where he obtained three graduate degrees, a Master's of Public Health in 1981, a Master of Arts in sociology in 1982, and a joint Doctor of Philosophy in medical care organization and sociology in 1983.

Career

In 1984, Frenk was appointed director of the Centre of Public Health Research in the Ministry of Health of Mexico, a role he held until 1987. Following that, he went on to serve as the founding director general of the National Institute of Public Health of Mexico from 1987 to 1992. From 1995 to 1998, he served as executive vice president of the Mexican Health Foundation, a private non-profit organization, and director of the organization's Centre for Health and the Economy.

Frenk also has served in several academic roles, including as a senior researcher at the National Institute of Public Health and as adjunct professor of medicine and national researcher at the National Autonomous University of Mexico in Mexico City. In 1992–1993, he was visiting professor at the Harvard Center for Population and Development Studies at Harvard University's Harvard T.H. Chan School of Public Health.

In 1993, he was an advisor on health reform for the government of Colombia, working alongside health economist Felicia Knaul. The two married in 1995, and settled in Mexico.

In 1998, Frenk was appointed executive director of evidence and information for policy at the World Health Organization (WHO) in Geneva.

Mexico's Minister of Health, 2000–2006
Following the election of Vicente Fox in Mexico's 2000 presidential election, Frenk was appointed minister of health of Mexico, a position he held until December 2006. In 2003, as Mexico's secretary of health, Frenk introduced a comprehensive national health insurance program called Seguro Popular, which expanded access to health care for tens of millions of previously uninsured Mexicans.

In 2003, Frenk was among five final candidates for the position of director-general of the World Health Organization (WHO) alongside Lee Jong-wook, Pascoal Mocumbi, Peter Piot, and Ismail Sallam; Lee was eventually appointed the position.

In 2004, Frenk was criticized by tobacco control advocates for his role in cutting an unusual deal with tobacco companies in which Philip Morris and British American Tobacco agreed to donate $400 million for health programs in Mexico over two and a half years but reserved the right to cancel the donation if cigarette taxes were raised

In July 2005, Frenk drew criticism from U.S. Interior Secretary Carlos Abascal over the Mexican Ministry of Health's decision to distribute the morning-after pill at Mexico's government health clinics.

In September 2006, the Mexican government again nominated Frenk as a candidate for the leadership of WHO. The British medical journal The Lancet published an editorial endorsing Frenk as the best candidate while The Wall Street Journal reported that Frenk's controversial 2004 tobacco deal could hurt his chances for election. Alongside Elena Salgado, Kazem Behbehani, Margaret Chan and Shigeru Omi, Frenk eventually became one of the five finalists. But in November 2006, the position was awarded to Chan.

Harvard University

Following his service as Mexico's minister of health, Frenk was tapped to serve as senior fellow in the global health program of the Bill & Melinda Gates Foundation, where he counseled the foundation on global health issues and strategies.

Frenk subsequently served as dean of the faculty at Harvard University's School of Public Health from 2009 until 2015. While at Harvard, he was also the T & G Angelopoulos Professor of Public Health and International Development, a joint appointment made with the Harvard Kennedy School. Under Frenk's leadership, Harvard's School of Public Health received its largest ever gift of $350 million and was renamed Harvard T.H. Chan School of Public Health in 2014.

In addition to his role as dean of Harvard School of Public Health, Frenk co-chaired (alongside Lincoln Chen) the Commission on the Education of Health Professionals for the 21st Century, which published its final report in The Lancet in 2010. The report recommended that governments place the same emphasis on fighting cancer that they place on infectious diseases like AIDS and malaria. In 2013, Fenk joined Vicente Fox and others in campaigning for marijuana legalization at a series of events in the United States and Mexico.

In 2015, Frenk co-edited a collection of non-fiction essays on the subject of global health, "To Save Humanity," which include work from multiple contributors including Michelle Bachelet, Larry Summers, Elton John and himself.

University of Miami
On April 13, 2015, the University of Miami announced the appointment of Frenk as the university's sixth president, succeeding Donna Shalala. He was officially inaugurated on January 29, 2016. 

In 2015, Frenk's salary as University of Miami president was $1.14 million.

Since 2022, Frenk has been a member of the Commission for Universal Health convened by Chatham House and co-chaired by Helen Clark and Jakaya Kikwete.

Other activities
 Exemplars in Global Health, Member of the Senior Advisory Board (since 2020)
 United Nations Foundation, Member of the Board of Directors (since 2016)
 Miami-Dade Beacon Council, Member of the Board of Directors (since 2015) 
 Robert Wood Johnson Foundation (RWJF), Member of the Board of Trustees (since 2015) 
 Commonwealth Fund, Member of the Board of Directors (since 2010)
 Institute for Health Metrics and Evaluation (IHME), University of Washington, chair of the Board
 Inter-American Dialogue, Member

Awards
 Cecilio A. Robelo Award for Scientific Research, State of Morelos, 1993.
 Frank A. Calderone Prize, 2018.
 Fellow, Michigan Society of Fellows, The University of Michigan, (1982–1984).
 National researcher, Mexican Research System, Mexico City, (1984–1998).
 International Fellow in Health, The W.K. Kellogg Foundation, (1986–1989).
 Member of the U.S. Institute of Medicine
 Member of the Inter-American Dialogue

Honors
 The Julio Frenk Professorship of Public Health Leadership was established at the Harvard T.H. Chan School of Public Health at Harvard University with part of a September 2016, $10 million gift.

References

External links
  Profile on the site of the Presidency of Mexico.
  Ministry of Health.
 Profile at the Harvard School of Public Health
 Speeches and Events, Harvard School of Public Health 
 Profile at the OECD website.
 Frenk supports pill, denies rift with Abascal Article on El Universal.
 https://web.archive.org/web/20130725040926/http://juliofrenk2006who.org/
 Dr Frenk gives a lecture on "Globalization and Health: Challenges to health systems in an interdependent world" on March 26, 2008
 http://news.bbc.co.uk/2/hi/americas/7002127.stm 
 The Lancet – Vol. 371, Issue 9607, January 12, 2008
 https://web.archive.org/web/20080914043151/http://www.thelancetglobalhealthnetwork.com/archives/112
 Global Task Force on Expanded Access to Cancer Care and Control in Developing Countries

1953 births
Living people
National Autonomous University of Mexico alumni
University of Michigan School of Public Health alumni
University of Michigan fellows
Harvard School of Public Health faculty
Mexican Secretaries of Health
Mexican public health doctors
Fellows of the American Academy of Arts and Sciences
People from Mexico City
Mexican people of German-Jewish descent
Presidents of the University of Miami
University of Michigan College of Literature, Science, and the Arts alumni
Members of the Inter-American Dialogue
21st-century Mexican politicians
Members of the National Academy of Medicine